The Al-Khanqah al-Salahiyya Mosque is an Islamic place of worship located in the Christian Quarter of the Old City of Jerusalem, north of the Church of the Holy Sepulchre. It was named after Saladin, who endowed it. As the name indicates, the complex was originally a khanqah, a place for gatherings of Sufi Islamic adherents, including dervishes. The complex today comprises the mosque as well as a school, a public sitting room, rooms for military officers, a dining room for wayfarers, small rooms for guards, and a very small room for Saladin’s spiritual retreat.

History
The building is situated on the former palace of the Latin Patriarch of Jerusalem.

Following the Crusader surrender of Jerusalem to Ṣalāḥ ad-Dīn (Saladin) in 1187, it became . The building comprised a mosque, a school, a public sitting room, rooms for military officers, a dining room for wayfarers, and small rooms originally for guards, as well as a very small room for Salah ad-Din (Saladin)'s spiritual retreat. As the name indicates, it has also been a Khanqah, a convent of Sufi adherents.

The minaret was built in 1417, during the Mamluk period. The minaret is almost identical to that of the Mosque of Omar, located on the other side of the Church of the Holy Sepulchre. The two minarets were obviously designed as a pair; a line connecting the two minarets would intersect the door of the Tomb of Jesus inside the church, and the minarets are equidistant to that door with their tops at exactly the same elevation despite starting at different ground levels.

Gallery

References

Further reading

 (pp. 87−91)
 (pp. 517−518)

External links 
Al-Khanqa al-Salahiyya
al-Khanqah al-Salahiyya 

Mosques in Jerusalem
Ayyubid architecture in the State of Palestine
Mamluk architecture
Mosques converted from churches by the Ayyubid dynasty
Christian Quarter